The Tsaplya class LCAC (Project 1206.1, Murena) is a medium size assault hovercraft operated by the Russian Navy.

History
These crafts are a lengthened version of the Lebed class LCAC hovercraft, which is the Russian Navy equivalent to the U.S. Navy LCAC. They were also meant to replace the smaller Gus class LCAC. The prototype was built at Feodosiya and entered service in 1982. The second was completed in 1987. By the early 1990s ten ships had been produced. Like the Lebed they could be transported by the Ivan Rogov class assault transport. The ships had a bow ramp with a gun on the starboard side and the bridge to port. They were more heavily armed than the Lebed class and were probably used as patrol craft in addition to troop and equipment transport duties. The Tsaplya class was built for Border Guards service along the Amur and Ussuri River borders with China, and all served in the Amur/Ussuri River Flotilla. The type began to be withdrawn following the fall of the Soviet Union. Three ships have been scrapped, and by 1995 none were observed to be operational in the Russian Navy.  In 2003 the ROK Navy ordered three vessels from Russia.  According to a source from the Russian delegation to the IndoDefence 2014 exhibition, the ROK Navy is interested in purchasing several more upgraded Murena-E vessels and in the repair of its current trio of vessels.

On 10 January 2023, it was reported that the Khabarovsk shipbuilding plant is planning to resume construction of a modernised version of the Tsaplya class in 2023.

See also
List of ships of the Soviet Navy
List of ships of Russia by project number

References

 Sharpe, Richard (RN) (ed.) Jane's Fighting Ships 1990-91 

Amphibious warfare vessels of the Soviet Navy
Amphibious warfare vessels of the Russian Navy
Military hovercraft
Landing craft